Mochamad Ridwan Kamil (born 4 October 1971) is an Indonesian architect and politician who is the 15th Governor of West Java, the largest (most populous) province of Indonesia. He was also the mayor of Bandung from 2013 to 2018. As an architect, he designed iconic structures in Indonesia and other countries in Asia with his Urbane architectural firm and lectured at the Department of Architecture, Bandung Institute of Technology.

Education
Kamil spent almost his entire life in Bandung where he went to public schools and studied architecture at Indonesia's leading state engineering school, the Bandung Institute of Technology. After obtaining his college degree, he went to the United States to apprentice at architectural firms before winning a scholarship in 1999 to study at the  College of Environmental Design, University of California, Berkeley in the United States. He graduated in 2001 with a Master of Urban Design degree and work experience at a Berkeley government department. He obtained Doctor (honoris causa) in Public Administration degree from Dong-a University in 2019 for his role in developing dynamic governance system for West Java Province.

Professional career
After working as an architect in Hong Kong, in June 2004 Kamil and his partners founded Urbane, an architecture firm based in Bandung, West Java. He introduced modern designs into his work that ranges from commercial buildings and university towers to museums and mosques. He is also known for creating open public spaces in crowded residential areas in Bandung as his pro bono work.

Awards
In 2006, Kamil was the winner of the British Council's Young Creative Entrepreneur Award, representing Indonesia in the International Young Design Entrepreneur of the Year award.

Urbane Indonesia was listed in the BCI Asia Top 10 Awards from 2008 to 2010 and again in 2012.

Projects
Kamil was the pioneer of the 'Indonesia Berkebun' (Gardening Indonesia) movement to build amateur gardens in the cities of Indonesia.   the community project is established in fourteen cities in Indonesia, with membership approaching 4000.

Kamil and Urbane Indonesia projects in Indonesia include 
 United Tractors office tower in Jakarta,
 Al-Irsyad Mosque and Al-Irsyad Satya Islamic School in Bandung,
 Aceh Tsunami Museum in Banda Aceh,
 Tarumanagara University Tower I and campus renovation in West Jakarta, and
 Rasuna Epicentrum mall in South Jakarta

International projects include
 Marina Bay, Singapore Master Plan,
 Beijing Islamic Centre Mosque,
 Ras Al Khaimah Waterfront Master Plan,
 Suzhou Retail Waterfront Masterplan in China,
 Tech Park Kunming
 Grand Tourism Community Club House in Calcutta

Political career

Mayor of Bandung 

Kamil stepped into politics ahead of the 2013 Bandung mayoral election as a surprise candidate endorsed by the Islamist Prosperous Justice Party (PKS) and the nationalist Great Indonesia Movement Party (Gerindra), two rising parties from different ends of Indonesia's political spectrum that united to reform the city and prevent the position to go into the hands of the big parties at that time. Under the big parties, Bandung had been racked by corruption scandals. A few weeks after the June 2013 vote, 2003-13 Bandung mayor Dada Rosada became a corruption suspect himself and later received a 10-year jail sentence. PKS and Gerindra experimented by offering a clean, telegenic candidate without political affiliation but with known professional achievements through his iconic designs. Kamil, who until now is unaffiliated to any party, decisively defeated seven opponents in the race with 45% of votes, which almost tripled what his closest rival got, before becoming mayor of one of the most populous cities in Indonesia at the age of 42.

Governor of West Java 
Being a popular mayor with a nationwide appeal, several big parties courted Kamil to run in the 2018 West Java gubernatorial election on their tickets but as a running mate to bolster the actual candidate for governor, who would be an affiliated politician. PKS and Gerindra, who had become stronger parties by 2018, also decided to pair their own members in a ticket. Similar to the 2013 experience, Kamil received endorsements from smaller parties, including the Islamist United Development Party that provided him a running mate, Tasikmalaya Regent Uu Ruzhanul Ulum. Kamil agreed to this arrangement, realizing he was popular among media-savvy urban voters, especially around Bandung, but weak among those who live in rural areas like Tasikmalaya. Kamil again won decisively with 33%, four percentage above his closest rival from Gerindra.       

Kamil's victories in 2013 and 2018 proved that an unaffiliated candidate could win in Indonesian elections if the person has popular appeal, cultivated through strong media campaigns, and good communications with parties of all stripes. Despite his Western education and pluralist attitudes, Kamil understands how to build rapport with Islamists in Indonesia, the country with the world's largest Muslim population, in particular in West Java that is known for its Islamic conservatism. On January 2023, he officially joined the Golkar Party.

2024 presidential bid 
On 18 January 2022, Kamil announced his intention to run as presidential candidate. Since he is an independent politician and realizing it is currently impossible for independent politician run for presidential campaign in Indonesia, he hoped that there will be any political party will take him as the presidential candidate. 

In late December 2022, Reports emerged that Kamil is close to joining a political party with speculations that the move is part of his continued efforts to enter the presidential race. The two parties said to be closest to recruiting him are members of the United Indonesia Coalition (KIB), The National Mandate Party (PAN), and The Party of Functional Groups (Golkar).

Bid for head of new Indonesian capital 
On 20 January 2022, Joko Widodo expressed his intention to set an architect and had experience in regional managing and governing as future CEO of the National Capital Authority of Nusantara, the future capital of Indonesia. Until 2022, only a few technocrats which hailed from architecture background which have name and reputation in Indonesian politics, Kamil himself, Tri Rismaharini, the current Minister of Social Affairs, and Danny Pomanto, former architecture lecturer of Hasanuddin University and current mayor of Makassar. Although initially reluctant to campaign for the position, on 24 January 2022, Kamil launched an electronic campaign to harness aspiration for the future capital project on Twitter.

Personal life 
Kamil had two biological children, Emmeril Kahn Mumtadz (1999–2022) and Camillia Laetitia Azzahra (b. 2004), and one adopted child, Arkana Aidan Misbach (b. 2020). Emmeril died in Bern, Switzerland on 26 May 2022 at the age of 22, while he was swimming in the Aare river. On 9 June, his body was found at the Engehalde dam in Bern. His death was the subject of much attention in Indonesia: his funeral in Bandung was attended by thousands and broadcast live on state TV.

In popular culture
Ridwan Kamil made some cameo appearances in several TV and movie productions, particularly the ones that are set in Bandung. Kamil also runs very active social media accounts that document his personal, professional, and political activities with millions of followers.

Filmography

Film

Television

References

External links
 
 http://www.indonesiakreatif.net/index.php/id/ceritasukses/read/ridwan-kamil
 http://www.thejakartapost.com/news/2010/06/22/on-a-quest-jakarta%E2%80%99s-architectural-identity.html
 Urbane Indonesia
 Awards
 Indonesia Berkebun
 http://www.architecturaldigest.com/decor/2009-09/ridwan_kamil_article
 Ridwan Kamil, TEDx Jakarta (blog)
 
 
 

1971 births
Living people
Sundanese people
Indonesian Muslims
People from Bandung
Mayors of Bandung
UC Berkeley College of Environmental Design alumni
20th-century Indonesian architects
21st-century Indonesian architects
Governors of West Java
Mayors of places in Indonesia
Dong-a University alumni